The Cobălcescu gas field natural gas field located on the continental shelf of the Black Sea. It was discovered in 2000 and developed by Petrom. It began production in 2002 and produces natural gas and condensates. The total proven reserves of the Cobălcescu gas field are around 70 billion cubic feet (2 km³), and production is slated to be around 30 million cubic feet/day (0.84×106m³).

References

Black Sea energy

Natural gas fields in Romania